New Best Friend is a 2002 American psychological thriller film based on a story by author James Edwards. The film was originally owned by MGM, which eventually let this film go. Since then, TriStar Pictures acquired the rights to distribute this film in the United States and some other territories, primarily for home video market; still, TriStar Pictures gave this film a limited theatrical release in the United States on April 12, 2002.

Plot summary

A North Carolina sheriff (Taye Diggs) investigates the near-fatal drug overdose of a working class college girl (Mia Kirshner) and discovers many sordid details of her life before and during her descent into drugs and debauchery.

Cast credits
 Mia Kirshner: Alicia Campbell
 Meredith Monroe: Hadley Ashton
 Dominique Swain: Sidney Barrett
 Rachel True: Julianne Livingstone
 Eric Michael Cole: Warren
 Scott Bairstow: Trevor
 Taye Diggs: Sheriff Artie Bonner
 Oliver Hudson: Josh
 Joanna Canton: Sarah
 Dean James: Max
 Glynnis O'Connor: Connie Campbell
 Ralph Price: Eddie

Notes

External links
 
 
 

2002 films
2000s mystery drama films
2002 psychological thriller films
2000s teen drama films
2002 thriller drama films
American mystery thriller films
American psychological thriller films
American teen drama films
American thriller drama films
Films about drugs
Films scored by John Murphy (composer)
Films set in North Carolina
Films set in universities and colleges
Films shot in North Carolina
Films shot in South Carolina
Teen mystery films
TriStar Pictures films
2002 drama films
2000s English-language films
2000s American films